

Portugal
 Angola – José Rodrigues Coelho do Amaral, Governor-General of Angola (1868–1870)

United Kingdom
 Gibraltar – Richard Airey, Governor of Gibraltar (1865–1870)
 Jamaica – Sir John Peter Grant, Governor of Jamaica (1866–1874)
Malta Colony – Patrick Grant, Governor of Malta (1867–1872)
New South Wales – Somerset Lowry-Corry, Lord Belmore, Governor of New South Wales (1868–1872)
 Queensland – Samuel Blackall, Governor of Queensland (1868–1871)
 Tasmania – Sir Charles Du Cane, Governor of Tasmania (1869–1874)
 Saint Lucia Sir William Des Vœux, Administrator of Saint Lucia (1869–1878)
 South Australia – Sir James Fergusson, Bt, Governor of South Australia (1869–1873)
 Victoria – John Manners-Sutton, Lord Canterbury, Governor of Victoria (1866–1873)
 Western Australia 
 Sir Benjamin Pine, Governor of Western Australia (1868–1869)
 Major Frederick Weld, Governor of Western Australia (1869–1875)

References

Colonial governors
Colonial governors
1869